The Incredible Sound Machine is the fifth and final album by old school hip hop/electro funk group Mantronix, and the third Mantronix album released on Capitol Records. The Incredible Sound Machine featured new member, vocalist Jade Trini, who replaced D.J. D.  Trini joined rapper Bryce "Luvah" Wilson (who made his debut on Mantronix's previous album, 1990's This Should Move Ya), and founding member, DJ Kurtis Mantronik.

The Incredible Sound Machine was a departure from previous Mantronix albums, in that it favored house music, R&B, and new jack swing over the old school hip hop/electro funk sound for which the group was most famously known.

Shortly after the European tour and promotion related to the release of the album, which was critically panned and commercially disappointing, Mantronix disbanded.

Track listing
 "Step To Me (Do Me)" (Mantronik, Angie Stone) – 4:00  
 "Don't Go Messin' With My Heart" (D. Bright, Stone) – 4:20
 "Flower Child (Summer Of Love)" (Mantronik, Stone, Terry Taylor) – 4:56
 "Gimme' Something" (Mantronik, Stone, Taylor) – 4:07
 "Put A Little Love On Hold (Duet with Terry Taylor)" (Mantronik, Stone, Bright) – 4:44
 "Well I Guess You" (Mantronik, Stone, Bright) – 3:47
 "Step To Me (Do Me) (12" Extended Mix) (Bonus Track)" (Mantronik, Stone) – 5:29
 "If You Could Read My Mind" (Mantronik, Bryce Wilson) – 4:40
 "Make It Funky" (Wilson) – 3:38
 "(I'm) Just Adjustin My Mic ('91)" (Mantronik, Wilson) – 3:11
 "Operation Mindcrime" (Mantronik, Wilson) – 2:19

Chart positions
British Hit Albums – album

British Hit Singles – singles

References

External links
 [ The Incredible Sound Machine] at AllMusic

1991 albums
Mantronix albums
Capitol Records albums
Albums produced by Kurtis Mantronik